Teige Mac Con Midhe, Irish poet and writer, died in 1493.

Mac Con Midhe was a member of an Irish brehon family. According to the Annals of the Four Masters:

 M1493.17 Mac Namee, i.e. Teige, the son of Conor Roe, son of Eachmarcach, an eminent poet and a good scholar, was slain by a labourer, one of his own people. i.e. the son of O'Clumhain.

See also

 Giolla Brighde Mac Con Midhe (fl. 1210?–1272?)
 Brian Mac Con Midhe, chief poet to Turlough Luineach O'Neill
 Cormac Mac Con Midhe (d.1627

References

 Glimpses of Gaelic Ireland,, 33–64, G. Murphy, Dublin, 1948.
 Lámhscríbhinní Gaeilge: Treoirliosta, Padraig de Brún, Dublin, 1988. 
 Tyrone's Gaelic Literary Legacy, by Diarmaid Ó Diobhlin, in Tyrone: History and Society, 403–432, ed. Charles Dillon and Henry A. Jefferies, Geography Publications, Dublin, 2000. .
 ''Medieval Ireland: An Encyclopedia", edited by Seán Duffy, Dublin, 2004.

External links
 http://www.goireland.com/genealogy/family.htm?FamilyId=997

Medieval Irish poets
People from County Tyrone
15th-century Irish poets
Irish male poets